Pablo Uribe (21 February 1931 – 13 May 2021) was a Colombian fencer. He competed in the individual and team foil and team épée events at the 1956 Summer Olympics.

References

External links
 

1931 births
2021 deaths
Colombian male épée fencers
Olympic fencers of Colombia
Fencers at the 1956 Summer Olympics
Colombian male foil fencers
20th-century Colombian people